Sara E. Nelson is an American businesswoman and politician serving as a member of the Seattle City Council from Position 9. A member of the Democratic Party, she defeated Nikkita Oliver in the 2021 election.

References

External links
 Campaign website

21st-century American women politicians
21st-century American politicians
Living people
Seattle City Council members
Washington (state) Democrats
Women city councillors in Washington (state)
Year of birth missing (living people)
University of California, Santa Barbara alumni
University of Washington alumni